U.C. Sampdoria recorded its best league season since 1960-61, thanks to a fourth place-finish. President Mantovani had surprised the football world by signing Liverpool stalwart Graeme Souness to the squad, and it paid off, with Souness adapting quickly to Italian football, also helping the team to win the 1985 edition of Coppa Italia, which was the first ever title for the club. The defensive line, with Moreno Mannini, Pietro Vierchowod and Antonio Paganin among the crew, was the main reason for the success, Sampdoria conceding just 23 goals in 30 league matches played. Quite a few of the players were still with the club when it finally won the league title in 1991.

Squad

Goalkeepers
  Ivano Bordon
  Roberto Bocchino

Defenders
  Pietro Vierchowod
  Luca Pellegrini
  Alessandro Renica
  Roberto Galia
  Antonio Paganin
  Enzo Gambaro

Midfielders
  Fausto Pari
  Graeme Souness
  Alessandro Scanziani
  Fausto Salsano
  Evaristo Beccalossi
  Francesco Casagrande
  Giovanni Picasso

Attackers
  Trevor Francis
  Roberto Mancini
  Gianluca Vialli

Competitions

Serie A

League table

Matches

Topscorers
  Trevor Francis 6
  Fausto Salsano 6
  Graeme Souness 5
  Alessandro Scanziani 4
  Roberto Mancini 3
  Gianluca Vialli 3

Coppa Italia

Group phase

Eightfinals

Quarterfinals

Semifinals

Final

Sources
  RSSSF - Italy 1984/85

U.C. Sampdoria seasons
Sampdoria